Two Lane Highway is the third album by American country rock band Pure Prairie League, released in 1975 (see 1975 in music).

The line-up of the band was drastically changed from their previous albums. It was the first album without founding member Craig Fuller, who was the primary songwriter, and vocalist, on their two previous LP's.
 
In addition to the usual 2-channel stereo version the album was also released by RCA Records in a 4-channel quadraphonic sound version in 1975.

The album was reissued in 2017 on hybrid Super Audio CD by Dutton Vocalion. This edition was remastered from the original master tapes and contains both the original stereo and quadraphonic mixes. The disc is a 2 on 1 release, also containing the band's 1976 album "If The Shoe Fits".

Track listing

Side A
"Two Lane Highway" (Goshorn) - 4:04
"Kentucky Moonshine" (Goshorn) - 2:30
"Runner" (Powell) - 2:39
"Memories" (Goshorn, Richard Palmer) - 2:52
"Kansas City Southern" (Gene Clark) - 2:55

Side B
"Harvest" (Goshorn) - 3:36
"Sister's Keeper" (Powell) - 3:45
"Just Can't Believe It" (Goshorn, Reilly) - 2:21
"Give Us a Rise" (Hinds, Powell) - 2:27
"I'll Change Your Flat Tire, Merle" (Nick Gravenites) - 2:09
"Pickin' to Beat the Devil" (Tom McGrail) - 2:52

Personnel
Pure Prairie League
George Ed Powell - guitar, vocals
Larry Goshorn - guitar, vocals
John David Call - steel guitar, banjo, dobro, vocals
Michael Connor - keyboards
Michael Reilly - bass, vocals
Billy Hinds - drums
Additional personnel
Chet Atkins - guitar
Vincent DeRosa - French horn
Don Felder - mandolin
Johnny Gimble - fiddle, violin
Emmylou Harris - vocals
Steven Edney - vocals, congas
John Rotella - clarinet, keyboards
Sid Sharp - concertmaster
Production
Producer: John Boylan
Engineer: Paul Grupp
Digital producer: Chick Crumpacker
Digital engineer: Dick Baxter
Mastering: Wally Traugott
Orchestration: Jimmie Haskell
Coordination: Marge Meoli
Project Director: Paul Williams
Art direction: Jacqueline Murphy
Photography: Neil Zlozower

Charts

Album
Billboard (United States)

Singles
Billboard (United States)

References

Pure Prairie League albums
1975 albums
Albums conducted by Jimmie Haskell
Albums produced by John Boylan (record producer)
RCA Records albums